Shahram Chubin is a former nonresident senior fellow in the Carnegie Nuclear Policy Program. He was director of research at the Geneva Centre for Security Policy in Switzerland from 1996 until 2009. Born in Iran and educated in Britain and the United States, he is a Swiss national and before joining the GCSP, he taught at the Graduate Institute for International Studies in Geneva (1981–1996). He received his doctorate from Columbia University.

Works
 Mullahs, Guards, and Bonyads: An Exploration of Iranian Leadership Dynamics, by David E. Thaler, Alireza Nader, Shahram Chubin, Jerrold D. Green, Charlotte Lynch, and Frederic Wehrey, RAND (2010),  
 Iran's Nuclear Ambitions, Carnegie Endowment for International Peace (2006),  
  Wither Iran? Reform, Domestic Politics and National Security, Routledge (2002)
  Iran's Security Policy in the Post-Revolutionary Era, by Daniel Byman, Shahram Chubin, Anoushiravan Ehteshami, and Jerrold D. Green, RAND (2001)
 Iran and Iraq at War, by Shahram Chubin and Charles Tripp, Routledge (1988),  
 The Foreign Relations of Iran: A Developing State in a Zone of Great-power Conflict, by Shahram Chubin and Sepehr Zabih with contributions by Paul Seabury, University of California Press (1974),

See also 
Iran's nuclear program

References 

Iranian emigrants to the United States
Iranian emigrants to Switzerland
Iranian expatriate academics
Living people
Iranian emigrants to the United Kingdom
Academic staff of the Graduate Institute of International and Development Studies
Year of birth missing (living people)